Prince Stanislaw Lubomirski (1704–1793) was a Polish noble (szlachcic) and magnate.  He was the son of Jerzy Aleksander Lubomirski and Joanna von Starzhausen.

Stanisław became the Podstoli of the Crown in 1739. He became the voivode of Bracław Voivodeship in 1764 and of Kiev Voivodeship in 1772. He was also the starost of Nowy Sącz.

He owned large estates, 31 cities, and 738 villages and had an income of about 2,920,000 zł per year.

He was a knight of the Order of the White Eagle, awarded on 3 August 1744 in Warsaw.

He married Ludwika Honorata Pociej and had several children.  His son Józef Aleksander Lubomirski's son was Prince Henryk Ludwik Lubomirski, who married Teresa Czartoryska.

References

Secular senators of the Polish–Lithuanian Commonwealth
1704 births
1793 deaths
Stanislaw Lubomirski 1704